Bhangbaria Union is a union parishad of Alamdanga Upazila, in Chuadanga District, Khulna Division of Bangladesh. There are 6 villages and 3 mouzas in the union.

References

External links
 

Unions of Khulna Division
Unions of Alamdanga Upazila
Unions of Chuadanga District